Oriental Negros International School Philippines, stylised as ONE International School Philippines, is a British international school in Dauin, Negros Oriental, Philippines. It was established in 2010.

The school is accredited to the Department of Education and is partnered with the UK Department for Education. It is also a member of the Council of British International Schools. As well as following a British curriculum, Philippine languages such as Visayan and Tagalog are also taught in the school.

References

British international schools in the Philippines
International schools in the Philippines
Schools in Negros Oriental
Educational institutions established in 2010
2010 establishments in the Philippines